Lineostethus is a genus of stink bugs in the family Pentatomidae. There are at least four described species in Lineostethus.

Species
These four species belong to the genus Lineostethus:
 Lineostethus clypealis
 Lineostethus clypeatus (Stål, 1862)
 Lineostethus marginellus (Stål, 1872)
 Lineostethus tenebricornis (Ruckes, 1957)

References

Further reading

 
 
 

Pentatomidae
Articles created by Qbugbot